The 1st Cavalry Division was a unit of the Reichswehr, the armed forces of Germany during the Weimar Republic.

It consisted of 6 cavalry regiments, the 1st, 2nd, 3rd, 4th, 5th and 6th (Prussian) Regiments.

Its commanders were:

General of the Cavalry Rudolf von Horn 1 June 1920 - 1 June 1921
Generalleutnant Otto Freiherr von Tettau 1 June 1920 - 1 April 1923
General of the Cavalry Walther von Jagow 1 April 1923 - 1 February 1927
Generalleutnant Ulrich von Henning auf Schönhoff 1 February 1927 - 1 February 1929
Generalleutnant Georg Brandt 1 February 1929 - 1 December 1929
Generalleutnant Fedor von Bock 1 December 1929 - 1 October 1931
Generalleutnant Werner von Fritsch 1 October 1931 - 1 October 1932
Generalleutnant Ludwig Beck 1 October 1932 - 1 October 1933
Generalleutnant Hans Feige 1 October 1933 - 1 April 1935

It was subordinated to Gruppenkommando 1.

References

Cavalry divisions of Germany
Military units and formations established in 1920
Military units and formations disestablished in 1935